Magnis Valley is a broad ice-free valley,  long, lying  west of Derrick Peak in the Britannia Range, Antarctica. It was named in association with Britannia by a University of Waikato geological party, 1978–79, led by Michael Selby; Magnis is a historical placename formerly used in Roman Britain.

Further reading 
 Courtney King, Dr. Brenda Hall, Trevor Hillebrand, and Dr. John Stone, History of Grounded Ice in the Ross Embayment since the Last Glacial Maximum Using the Glacial Geology Alongside the Hatherton and Darwin Glacier system, Antarctica

References

Valleys of Oates Land